The 1928 New Jersey gubernatorial election was held on November 6, 1928. Republican nominee Morgan Foster Larson defeated Democratic nominee William L. Dill with 54.88% of the vote.

Primary elections
Primary elections were held on May 15, 1928.

Republican primary

Candidates
Robert Carey, Jersey City judge
Cornelius Doremus, candidate for Governor in 1925
Morgan Foster Larson, State Senator for Middlesex County from Perth Amboy
J. Henry Harrison, State Senator for Essex County from Caldwell

Results

Following the election, Carey alleged that many Democrats, at the behest of Jersey City boss Frank Hague, crossed party lines to vote for Larson.

Democratic primary

Candidates
William L. Dill, Motor Vehicle Commissioner

Results

General election

Candidates
Major party candidates
Morgan Foster Larson, Republican
William L. Dill, Democratic

Other candidates
Eugene A. Smith, Prohibition Party
W. K. Tallman, Socialist
Scott Nearing, Workers
John C. Butterworth, Socialist Labor Party of America

Results

References

1928
New Jersey
Gubernatorial
November 1928 events in the United States